Zacne grzechy is a 1963 Polish comedy film directed by Mieczysław Waśkowski.

Cast
 Henryk Bąk as Ojciec Makary
 Wiesław Gołas as Zbigniew Trzaska
 Marian Jastrzebski
 Bogumił Kobiela
 Irena Kwiatkowska as Firlejowa
 Franciszek Pieczka
 Witold Pyrkosz as Onufry Geba
 Alicja Sędzińska as Karczmarka Kasia
 Andrzej Szczepkowski as Przeor Ignacy
 Krystyna Kolodziejczyk as Witch Zosia

References

External links
 

1963 films
1963 comedy films
Polish comedy films
Polish black-and-white films
1960s Polish-language films